This list of alumni of the University of North Carolina School of the Arts includes high school, undergraduate, and graduate, former students of the University of North Carolina School of the Arts. UNCSA offers high school, undergraduate and graduate degrees from 5 arts schools of Dance, Design and Production, Drama, Film, and Music.

Dance

Drama

Design and production

Film

 Caitlin McHugh - actress, writer, model

Music

Visual arts

 Alexander Isley – graphic designer
 David LaChapelle – photographer and music video director
 Hunter Schafer - visual artist, actress and trans activist

References

University of North Carolina School of the Arts alumni
University of North Carolina School of the Arts